In Missouri, villages are municipalities which incorporated with a population under 500. If the population is larger than 500, it may incorporate as a city (see List of cities in Missouri).  If the population increases beyond 500 after incorporation, a vote may be held to change to a city government, but it is not automatic. Villages are governed by a board of trustees.  
Below is a list of villages in Missouri, arranged in alphabetical order.

A
Agency
Alba
Aldrich
Alexandria
Allendale
Allenville
Alma
Altamont
Altenburg
Alton
Amazonia
Amity
Amoret
Amsterdam
Annada
Annapolis
Anniston
Arbela
Arbyrd
Arcadia
Arcola
Argyle
Arkoe
Armstrong
Arrow Point
Arrow Rock
Asbury
Atlanta
Augusta
Aullville
Auxvasse
Avilla
Avondale

B
Bakersfield
Baldwin Park
Bellerive
Benton City
Bethel
Bigelow
Big Lake
Birmingham
Blackwater
Blodgett
Blue Eye
Blythedale
Brimson
Brooklyn Heights
Brown Station
Brumley
Budapest
Bull Creek
Burgess
Butterfield

C
Cairo
Caledonia
Carytown
Cave
Cedar Hill Lakes
Centertown
Chain-O-Lakes
Chain of Rocks
Champ
Chamois
Circle City
Cliff Village
Climax Springs
Clyde
Cobalt
Collins
Coney Island
Corning
Cosby
Country Life Acres

D
Dadeville
Dalton
Deerfield
Dennis Acres
Denver
Diehlstadt
Diggins
Dover
Dunlap

E
Eagleville
East Fenway
Edwards
Elmira
Emerald Beach
Eolia
Evergreen

F
Farley
Fenway Landing
Ferrelview
Fidelity
Filley
Flemington
Fordland
Fortescue
Foster
Fountain N' Lakes
Freeburg
Freistatt

G
Gentry
Gerster
Gibbs
Ginger Blue
Glenallen
Glencoe
Glen Echo Park
Glenwood
Goodnight
Gordonville
Grand Falls Plaza
Grand Pass
Granger
Grantwood Village
Gravois Mills
Grayson
Guilford
Gunn City

H
Halfway
Halltown
Harwood
Harrisburg
Hartsburg
Hayward
Haywood City
Hoberg
Holliday
Hughesville
Humphreys
Huntsdale

I
Iatan
Iconium
Indian Point
Innsbrook
Ionia
Irena
Iron Gates

J
Jacksonville
Jane
Jameson
Jerico Springs
Josephville
Junction City

K
Kelso
Kingdom City

L
Lakeland
Lake Mykee Town
Lamar Heights
La Russell
La Tour
Laurie
Leasburg
Leonard
Leslie
Lewis and Clark Village
Livonia
Lock Springs
Loma Linda
Longtown
Louisburg
Lucerne
Ludlow
Luray

M
Mackenzie
McCord Bend
McFall
Merwin
Metz
Milford
Millard
Mill Spring
Milo
Mineral Point
Miramiguoa Park
Montevallo
Monticello
Mooresville
Moundville
Mount Leonard
Mount Moriah

N
New Melle
Newark
Newtonia
North Lilbourn
North Wardell
Norwood Court

O
Oak Grove Village
Oak Ridge
Oaks
Oakview
Oakwood
Oakwood Park
Old Appleton
Olean
Osgood

P
Parkdale
Parkway
Pasadena Park
Pascola
Passaic
Paynesville
Pendleton
Penermon
Perry
Phillipsburg
Pickering
Pierpont
Pinhook
Plato
Prathersville
Preston

R
Raymondville
Rayville
Rea
Redings Mill
Renick
Rensselaer
Rhineland
Richards
Ridgely
Ritchey
River Bend
Roscoe
Rothville
Rush Hill
Rushville
Rutledge

S
Saddlebrooke
Saginaw
St. Cloud
St. Elizabeth
Sedgewickville
Shoal Creek Drive
Shoal Creek Estates
Sibley
Silex
Silver Creek
South Gifford
South Greenfield
South Lineville
Stark City
Stella
Stotesbury
Stoutsville
Sundown
Sunrise Beach
Sycamore Hills

T
Table Rock
Tallapoosa
Taneyville
Tarrants
Theodosia
Tightwad
Tina
Truxton
Turney
Tuscumbia
Twin Oaks

U
Umber View Heights
Unity Village
Uplands Park
Utica

V
Vandiver
Vanduser
Vinita Terrace
Vista

W
Wakenda
Watson
Weatherby
Weldon Spring Heights
Wentworth
Westboro
West Line
West Sullivan
Westwood
Whiteside
Whitewater
Wilbur Park
Wilson City
Windsor Place
Winston
Wooldridge

Z
Zalma

See also
List of municipalities in Missouri
List of cities in Missouri

References

 Official Manual State of Missouri 2017-2018.  Issued by the Secretary of State of Missouri, Jefferson City, Missouri.

External links
 Cities and Municipalities in Missouri
 Missouri Municipal League

Villages
 
Missouri